Peterson Ridge is a planned railroad station on the North Side of Chicago serving Metra's Union Pacific North Line. It will be located at the intersection of West Peterson Avenue and North Ravenswood Avenue. A groundbreaking ceremony for construction was held on November 1, 2021. The construction is expected to be complete sometime in 2023.

References

External links

Metra stations in Chicago
Proposed railway stations in the United States
Railway stations scheduled to open in 2023
Union Pacific North Line